Warren A. Miller (October 15, 1924 – January 24, 2018) was an American ski and snowboarding filmmaker. He was the founder of Warren Miller Entertainment and produced, directed and narrated films until 1988. His published works include over 750 sports films, several books and hundreds of non-fiction articles. Miller was inducted into the U.S. Ski Hall of Fame (1978), the Colorado Ski Hall of Fame (1995), and was awarded Lifetime Achievement Awards from the International Skiing History Association (2004) and the California Ski Industry Association (2008).

Biography

Early years
Warren Anthony Miller was born in Hollywood, Los Angeles, to Helena Humphrey Miller and Albert Lincoln Miller. He had two older sisters, Mary Helen Miller and Betty Jane "BJ" Miller.

As a young man he took up the hobbies of skiing, surfing, and photography. At the age of 18, with the U.S. ten months into World War II, he enlisted in the U.S. Navy and served in the South Pacific. On Christmas vacation in 1944, he first filmed skiing with a borrowed camera in Yosemite.

Upon his discharge from the Navy in 1946, Miller bought his first 8mm movie camera, a Bell & Howell costing $77 (equivalent to $ today). He and a friend, Ward Baker, moved to Sun Valley, Idaho where they lived in a teardrop trailer in the parking lot of the Sun Valley ski resort, and worked as ski instructors. In their free time, they filmed each other skiing to critique and improve their ski techniques. During the summers they shifted to the California coast where they filmed each other surfing.

Later work

After Miller showed his skiing and surfing films to friends, with accompanying commentary, he began to receive invitations to show and narrate them at parties. In 1949, he founded Warren Miller Entertainment [WME] and began producing one feature-length ski film per year. He lent money to rent halls and theaters, and charged admission to his shows. He booked show halls near ski resorts so that he could film the next year's footage during the day, and show the current film in the evening. Before long he was showing his films in 130 cities a year.

Miller continued to head Warren Miller Entertainment until the late 1980s when he sold the company to his son, Kurt Miller. Kurt later sold the company to Time, Inc., which sold it in 2007 to Bonnier Corporation, which was itself acquired by Active Interest Media in 2013. The company continued to produce a new film every year until 2023.  In January 2023 longtime Warren Miller collaborator, Chris Patterson, announced that, for the first time in 74 years, 2023 would not see the premiere of a new Warren Miller film, stating, "Due to financial challenges at Outside, the executives have chosen to assemble the future movies entirely with “existing footage” – no need for a camera crew, plane tickets, lift tickets and for that matter, no need for athletes or snow."

While transitioning out of his executive role, Miller still maintained his creative role as director and narrator for the films into the 1990s. The makers of later films, including Warren Miller's Higher Ground (2005) and Warren Miller's Off the Grid (2006), used Miller's narration from previous films rather than recording new narration.

In late 2010, Miller presented 'An Evening with Warren Miller' to two sold-out audiences at Seattle's Benaroya Hall.

In 1998, Miller became Director of Skiing at The Yellowstone Club, a private resort in Big Sky Montana.

Personal life
Miller's first wife Jean, mother of his oldest son Scott, died of cancer when her son was just one and half years old.
Miller then married Dorothy Marion Roberts in 1955. The marriage produced two children, a daughter Chris Ann (1957) and Kurt James (1959). The two were married for twenty years and lived in Hermosa Beach, California where the Warren Miller Production film company was located for almost 40 years.

Miller and his wife of 30 years, Laurie, lived on Orcas Island in the San Juan Islands north of Seattle.

In September 2016, Miller self-published his autobiography, Freedom Found: My Life Story. Andy Bigford, former editor-in-chief and publisher of Ski Magazine, co-authored the book, and Miller's wife contributed as well. After a sold out first printing, a second printing was released in December 2017.

Miller died January 24, 2018, at his home on Orcas Island.

Filmography

Movies released since 2004, while bearing Warren Miller's name, were not directed by Warren Miller, nor was he involved in their production in any way.  See the complete list for all films bearing Warren Miller's name.

Bibliography
 On Film in Print (1994) Vail, CO: Ritem and Printem 
 Lurching from One Near Disaster to the Next (1998) Deer Harbor, WA: Pole Pass Pub. 
 Wine, Women, Warren, & Skis, (2001) Warren Miller Productions; 14th edition; 
 Warren's World, (2002) Mountain Sports Press, 
 "The Good New Days" Ski (Jan 2004) Vol 68 #5:152
 "A Taste of Freedom" The Ski Journal (2010) vol 4.2 
Bigford, Andy and Miller, Warren (2016) Freedom Found: My Life Story Warren Miller Company

References

External links
  Warren Miller 
  Warren Miller Entertainment
 Warren Miller Foundation
 

American documentary filmmakers
American male non-fiction writers
American memoirists
American male alpine skiers
Film directors from Los Angeles
Military personnel from California
People from San Juan County, Washington
Writers from Los Angeles
1924 births
2018 deaths
Film directors from Washington (state)
United States Navy personnel of World War II